Benedict Mason, born on 23 February 1954, is a British composer.

Mason was educated at King's College, Cambridge (1971–75) and took a degree in film-making at the Royal College of Art (1975–78). He did not turn to composition until his early 30s, but his first acknowledged work, Hinterstoisser Traverse (1986), attracted attention from the European new music scene. His early works are decidedly postmodern in inclination, with considerable use of stylistic irony (some commentators have noted in these works a similarity to the music of Mauricio Kagel). Mason then developed an interest in polyrhythmic music, and in works such as his Double Concerto one can hear a strong stylistic affinity to the later works of György Ligeti. More recent works have concentrated on the spatial dimension of music, such as in his Music for European Concert Halls series, and sometimes have come very close to installation art.

Mason has composed in many genres, and his soccer opera Playing Away, with a libretto by Howard Brenton, was commissioned by the Munich Biennale and premièred there in 1994 by Opera North.

References

Sources

Further reading
Kennedy, Michael (2006). The Oxford Dictionary of Music, 
Toop, Richard (November–December 2004). "Forschung, Formung, Fantasie: Der britische Komponist Benedict Mason". Neue Zeitschrift für Musik 165, no. 6:58–59.

External links
 
Article by Volker Straebel on Mason's music
Interview (2004)
 
 Article by Bernhard König on Mason's Chaplin Operas

1954 births
20th-century classical composers
21st-century classical composers
English classical composers
Alumni of King's College, Cambridge
Alumni of the Royal College of Art
Living people
English male classical composers
20th-century English composers
21st-century English composers
Ernst von Siemens Composers' Prize winners
20th-century British male musicians
21st-century British male musicians